The 1956 Ohio Bobcats football team was an American football team that represented Ohio University in the Mid-American Conference (MAC) during the 1956 NCAA University Division football season. In their eighth season under head coach Carroll Widdoes, the Bobcats compiled a 2–7 record (2–4 against MAC opponents), finished in a tie for fourth place in the MAC, and were outscored by all opponents by a combined total of 211 to 36.  They played their home games in Peden Stadium in Athens, Ohio.

Schedule

References

Ohio
Ohio Bobcats football seasons
Ohio Bobcats football